The Avalon 8.2 folding trimaran is a trailerable fast cruising and racing sailboat designed by Ray Kendrick. It is sold in plan form.

See also
 List of multihulls

References

Trimarans